Nobody's Children may refer to:

Film and television
Nobody's Children (1920 film), an American film directed by Richard Maurice
Nobody's Children (1940 film), an American film directed by Charles Barton
Nobody's Children (1951 film), a French-Italian film directed by Raffaello Matarazzo
Nobody's Children (1994 film), an American television film directed by David Wheatley

Other media
Nobody's Children (novella), a 2007 Dr. Who novella
Nobody's Children, a 2015 box set by Tom Petty and the Heartbreakers

See also
Nobody's Child (disambiguation)